Commiphora guidottii, commonly known as scented myrrh or bisabol, is a tree or shrub species that is native to the countries of Somalia and Ethiopia. Essential oil from its gum-resin has been researched for its use in topical treatment of wounds.

Distribution 
Commiphora guidottii is native to two territories in the horn of Africa; the Ogaden region of eastern Ethiopia, and Somalia.  The tree is widely known in the Bari, Bakool, Galguduud, Gedo, Mudug, and Nugal regions of Somali where to the locals it is known as hadi or habakhadi.  The  growth of the tree is associated with gypsum producing areas and in open bushland.

Uses 
Historically, the essential oils and gum resin of C. guidottii is an export commodity from Somaliland, but considered to be inferior in quality to the resin obtained from its sister species, C. myrrha. The shrub is sometimes mixed with the forage given to milk producing cows so as to improve the quantity and quality of milk.

References 

guidottii
Flora of Somalia
Flora of Ethiopia